The Northern Cyclist Battalion was a bicycle infantry battalion of the Territorial Force, part of the British Army.  Formed in 1908, it served in the United Kingdom throughout the First World War and in 1920 it was converted as part of the Royal Garrison Artillery.

History

Formation
The majority of the battalion was newly raised at Sunderland (later at Newcastle-on-Tyne) in October 1908 as a bicycle infantry battalion of the British Army's Territorial Force. One existing cyclist company at Sunderland transferred from the 3rd Volunteer Battalion, Durham Light Infantry. Initially designated as the 8th (Cyclist) Battalion, Northumberland Fusiliers, in 1910 the new unit was separated from that regiment and redesignated as the independent Northern Cyclist Battalion.

In August 1914, the battalion was headquartered at the Hutton Terrace drill hall, Sandyford Road in Newcastle-on-Tyne and had the following companies:
 A CompanySunderland
 B CompanySunderland
 C CompanyWest Hartlepool
 D CompanyChester-le-Street
 E CompanyNewcastle-on-Tyne
 F CompanyBlyth
 G CompanyWhitley Bay
 H CompanyNewcastle-on-Tyne
At the outbreak of the First World War, the battalion was in Northern Command, unattached to any higher formation.  It was to be used as mobile infantry, and for work on signals, scouting and similar activities.

First World War
In accordance with the Territorial and Reserve Forces Act 1907 (7 Edw. 7, c.9) which brought the Territorial Force into being, the TF was intended to be a home defence force for service during wartime and members could not be compelled to serve outside the country. However, on the outbreak of war on 4 August 1914, many members volunteered for Imperial Service.  Therefore, TF units were split in August and September 1914 into 1st Line (liable for overseas service) and 2nd Line (home service for those unable or unwilling to serve overseas) units.  Later, 3rd Line units were formed to act as reserves, providing trained replacements for the 1st and 2nd Lines.

1/1st Northern Cyclist Battalion
The battalion was mobilized on 4 August 1914 at the outbreak of the First World War and moved to its war station at Morpeth.  In 1915 it was transferred to the Army Cyclist Corps.  By 1916 it had moved to Alnwick where it remained as part of the Tyne Garrison until the end of the war.  The battalion was disembodied on 24 January 1919.

2/1st Northern Cyclist Battalion
The 2nd Line battalion was formed in late 1914 and also remained in England throughout the war.  In 1916 it was at Skegness and in June 1918 it was at Burton Constable as part of the Humber Garrison where it remained.  The battalion was disbanded on 17 April 1919.

On 4 July 1915, the battalion provided personnel for the 10th Provisional Cyclist Company at Chapel St Leonards.

3/1st Northern Cyclist Battalion
The 3rd Line battalion was formed at Newcastle in 1915 to provide trained replacements for the 1st and 2nd Line battalions.  It was disbanded in March 1916 and the men were posted to 1/1st and 2/1st Battalions and to the Machine Gun Corps.

Post war
See main article 55th (Northumbrian) Medium Brigade, Royal Garrison Artillery
The Territorial Force was disbanded after the First World War, although this was a formality and it was reformed in 1920.  From 1 October 1921 it was renamed as the Territorial Army.

One major change with the new Territorial Army had an effect on the number of infantry battalions.  The original 14 divisions were reformed with the pre-war standard of three brigades of four battalions each, for a total of 168 battalions.  Infantry were no longer to be included as Army Troops or part of the Coastal Defence Forces so the pre-war total of 208 battalions had to be reduced by 40.  This was achieved by either converting certain battalions to other roles, usually artillery or engineers, or by amalgamating pairs of battalions within a regiment.  In particular, based on war time experience, the Army decided to dispense with cyclists units and the existing battalions were either disbanded or converted to artillery or signals units.

The Northern Cyclist Battalion was reformed at Newcastle on 7 February 1920.  Together with the former 3rd Northumbrian (County of Durham) Brigade, Royal Field Artillery it formed a medium artillery brigade of the Royal Garrison Artillery as 3rd (Northumbrian) Medium Brigade, Royal Garrison Artillery, soon redesignated as 55th (Northumbrian) Medium Brigade, Royal Garrison Artillery:
 Headquartersabsorbed HQ and Ammunition Column of 3rd Northumbrian (County of Durham) Brigade, RFA
 217th Medium Battery
 218th Medium Batteryformed from 1st Durham Battery, RFA
 219th Medium Batteryformed from 2nd Durham Battery, RFA
 220th Medium Batteryformed from 1st Durham Battery, RFA

See also

 Army Cyclist Corps

Notes

References

Bibliography

External links
 
 
 

Cyclist units and formations of the British Army
Infantry regiments of the British Army
Military units and formations established in 1908
Military units and formations disestablished in 1920
Battalions of the British Army in World War I
Military units and formations in County Durham
Military units and formations in Northumberland